Professor Christopher Howgego is a British numismatist and academic, who is the current keeper of the Heberden coin room at the Ashmolean Museum. He is also a Fellow of Wolfson College, Oxford, and Professor of Greek and Roman Numismatics at the University of Oxford.

References

External links
https://web.archive.org/web/20150402180211/http://www.classics.ox.ac.uk/chrishowgego.html

British numismatists
Fellows of Wolfson College, Oxford
Living people
Year of birth missing (living people)
Place of birth missing (living people)
People associated with the Ashmolean Museum
Alumni of the University of Oxford